Krodha may refer to:

 Krodha (Mental factor), a mental factor in Indian religions, translated as fury or rage; it causes one to harm others
 Wrathful deities, in Buddhism, enlightened beings who take on wrathful forms in order to lead sentient beings to enlightenment
 Krodha (Hinduism), anger; the father of Kali